Aegialites debilis is a species of narrow-waisted bark beetle in the family Salpingidae. It is found in North America.

References

Further reading

 

Salpingidae
Articles created by Qbugbot
Beetles described in 1853